Ruiz v Shell Oil Co, 413 F2d 310 (1969) is a US labor law case, concerning the scope of labor rights in the United States.

Facts
Mr Ruiz was employed by Zenith, Inc in Harvey, Louisiana. Zenith had a contract with Shell Oil Co to do welding, removing a dent in a metal tank that separated oil and water on one of Shell's barges. The tank was made by the National Tank Company, and it contracted with Shell to supervise tank repair, providing an employee named Mr Crowley. NTC had no contract with Zenith. Mr Ruiz was injured when a 30-ton hydraulic jack struck him after being dislodged on the barge. He sued Shell and NTC in negligence for the barge being unseaworthy, and Shell claimed damages from NTC. A jury awarded Mr Ruiz $50,000, and found only NTC's negligence was a proximate cause of injury.

Judgment
The Court of Appeals, Fifth Circuit held that NTC was liable to Ruiz, although on the facts it did not count as an employer. Relevant to that question would be which employer had more control, whose work was being performed, whether there were agreements in place, who provided tools, had a right to discharge the employee, or had the obligation to pay. Robert A. Ainsworth Jr. delivered the Court's judgment.

See also

United States labor law

Notes

References

United States labor case law